
A Lester Award is one of a range of awards given to jockeys at an annual ceremony in Great Britain. The awards are named in honour of Lester Piggott, an eleven-time British flat racing Champion Jockey who won thirty British Classic Races from 1954 to 1992. The awards were inaugurated in 1990, and they recognise the achievements of jockeys from both flat and jump racing during the previous year.

The ceremony to present the 2012 awards took place at the Hilton Birmingham Metropole Hotel, Birmingham, on 28 March 2013. The event was sponsored by Stobart. The awards ceremony had traditionally been held the night before Good Friday, a day with no racing in Great Britain, but the start of Good Friday racing in 2014 led to the event being moved to a December date, with the 2014 ceremony honouring jockeys for their achievements in 2013 and 2014.

Flat Jockey of the Year
 1990: Pat Eddery
 1991: Pat Eddery
 1992: Michael Roberts
 1993: Frankie Dettori
 1994: Frankie Dettori
 1995: Frankie Dettori
 1996: Pat Eddery / Frankie Dettori (tied)
 1997: Kieren Fallon
 1998: Kieren Fallon
 1999: Kieren Fallon
 2000: Kevin Darley
 2001: Kieren Fallon
 2002: Kieren Fallon
 2003: Kieren Fallon
 2004: Frankie Dettori
 2005: Jamie Spencer
 2006: Ryan Moore
 2007: Jamie Spencer
 2008: Ryan Moore
 2009: Ryan Moore
 2010: Paul Hanagan
 2011: Paul Hanagan
 2012: Richard Hughes
 2013: Richard Hughes
 2014: Ryan Moore
 2015: Silvestre de Sousa
 2016: Jim Crowley
 2017:
 2018: Oisin Murphy
 2019: Oisin Murphy
 2020: Hollie Doyle

Jump Jockey of the Year
 1990: Richard Dunwoody
 1991: Peter Niven
 1992: Richard Dunwoody
 1993: Richard Dunwoody
 1994: Richard Dunwoody
 1995: Richard Dunwoody
 1996: Tony McCoy
 1997: Tony McCoy
 1998: Tony McCoy
 1999: Tony McCoy
 2000: Tony McCoy
 2001: Tony McCoy
 2002: Tony McCoy
 2003: Tony McCoy
 2004: Tony McCoy
 2005: Timmy Murphy
 2006: Tony McCoy
 2007: Tony McCoy
 2008: Tony McCoy
 2009: Tony McCoy
 2010: Tony McCoy
 2011: Tony McCoy
 2012: Tony McCoy
 2013: Tony McCoy
 2014: Tony McCoy
 2015: Tony McCoy
 2016: Richard Johnson
 2017:
 2018: Richard Johnson
 2019: Richard Johnson
 2020: Brian Hughes

Apprentice Jockey of the Year
 1990: Jimmy Fortune
 1991: Darryll Holland
 1992: David Harrison
 1993: Jason Weaver
 1994: Michael Fenton
 1995: Seb Sanders
 1996: Dane O'Neill
 1997: Royston Ffrench
 1998: Neil Pollard
 1999: Robert Winston
 2000: Lee Newman
 2001: Keith Dalgleish
 2002: Paul Hanagan
 2003: Ryan Moore
 2004: Tom Queally
 2005: Hayley Turner
 2006: Stephen Donohoe
 2007: William Buick
 2008: William Buick
 2009: Frederik Tylicki
 2010: Martin Lane
 2011: Martin Harley
 2012: Amy Ryan
 2013:
 2014:
 2015: Tom Marquand
 2016: Josephine Gordon
 2017: 
 2018: Jason Watson
 2019: Cieren Fallon
 2020: Cieren Fallon

Conditional Jockey of the Year
 1990: Derek Byrne
 1991: Adrian Maguire
 1992: Mick Fitzgerald
 1993: Warren Marston
 1994: Tony Dobbin
 1995: Tony McCoy
 1996: Richard Johnson
 1997: Barry Fenton
 1998: Robert Thornton
 1999: Joe Tizzard
 2000: Noel Fehily
 2001: Liam Cooper
 2002: Marcus Foley
 2003: Marcus Foley
 2004: Jamie Moore
 2005: Paddy Brennan
 2006: William Kennedy
 2007: Tom O'Brien
 2008: Brian Hughes
 2009: Aidan Coleman
 2010: Rhys Flint
 2011: Sam Twiston-Davies
 2012: Henry Brooke
 2013:
 2014:
 2015: Sean Bowen
 2016: Craig Nichol
 2017:
 2018: James Bowen
 2019: Jonjo O'Neill jnr
 2020: Jonjo O'Neill jnr

Female Jockey of the Year
 1990: Alex Greaves
 1991: Alex Greaves
 1992: Emma O'Gorman
 1993: Diane Clay
 1994: Diane Clay
 1995: Alex Greaves
 1996: Sophie Mitchell
 1997: Alex Greaves
 1998: Alex Greaves
 1999: Sophie Mitchell
 2000: Joanna Badger
 2001: Joanna Badger
 2002: Joanna Badger
 2003: Lisa Jones
 2004: Hayley Turner
 2005: Hayley Turner
 2006: Hayley Turner
 2007: Hayley Turner
 2008: Hayley Turner
 2009: Hayley Turner
 2010: Cathy Gannon
 2011  Cathy Gannon
 2012: Lucy Alexander
 2013:
 2014:
 2015: Cathy Gannon
 2016: Josephine Gordon
 2017:
 2018: Nicola Currie
 2019: Hollie Doyle
 2020: Hollie Doyle

Jockey of the Year
 1990: Pat Eddery
 1991: Alan Munro
 1992: Michael Roberts
 1993: Adrian Maguire
 1994: Frankie Dettori
 1995: Frankie Dettori
 1996: Frankie Dettori
 1997: Tony McCoy
 discontinued after 1997

Honorary Lester
 1996: Peter O'Sullevan
 1997: Willie Carson
 2000: Jim Foster (JAGB Treasurer for 30 years)
 2001: Michael Caulfield (JAGB Chief Executive)
 2016: Anne Saunders (Professional Jockeys Association director)

Lifetime achievement award
 2008: Mick Fitzgerald

Chief Executive Award
 2007: Reg Hollinshead

PJA Directors Award
 2008: Tony Dobbin

International Jockey of the Year
 2007: Ruby Walsh
 2008: Ruby Walsh
 2009: Michael Kinane
 2010: Ruby Walsh

Flat Ride of the Year
 1998: Darryll Holland on Double Trigger in the Goodwood Cup, 30 July.
 1999: Francis Norton on She's Our Mare in the Cambridgeshire Handicap, 2 October.
 2000: Gary Bardwell on Bangalore in the Chester Cup, 10 May.
 2001: Steve Drowne on Harmonic Way in the Cork and Orrery Stakes, 21 June.
 2002: Darryll Holland on Just James at Newmarket, 25 May.
 2003: Martin Dwyer on Persian Punch in the Jockey Club Cup, 18 October.
 2004: Paul Mulrennan on Blue Spinnaker in the Zetland Gold Cup, 31 May.
 2005: Tony Culhane on Toss the Caber at Musselburgh, 4 July.
 2006: Martin Dwyer on Sir Percy in the Epsom Derby, 3 June.
 2007: Paul Hanagan on Fonthill Road at York, 13 October.
 2008: Jim Crowley on Bulwark in the Chester Cup, 7 May.
 2009: Tom Queally on Midday in the Breeders' Cup Filly & Mare Turf, 6 November.
 2010: Paul Hanagan on Opening Nite at Ayr, 17 September.
 2011: Paul Hanagan on Barefoot Lady in the Nell Gwyn Stakes, 13 April
 2012: Michael O'Connell on Qubuh at Hamilton Park, 6 May
 2013:
 2014:
 2015: David Nolan on Rex Imperator at Doncaster, 10 September
 2016: Robert Winston on Librisa Breeze at Ascot, 1 October
 2017:
 2018: Eoin Walsh on Storm Lightning at Wolverhampton, 22 September
 2019: Paul Hanagan on Dutch Decoy at Hamilton Park, 30 August
 2020: Dylan Hogan on Wanaash at Wolverhampton, 15 January

Jump Ride of the Year
 1998: Brian Harding on One Man in the Queen Mother Champion Chase, 18 March.
 1999: Richard Johnson on Anzum in the Stayers' Hurdle, 18 March.
 2000: Tony Dobbin on Master Tern in the Vincent O'Brien County Hurdle, 16 March.
 2001: Richard Guest on Red Marauder in the Grand National, 7 April.
 2002: Rodi Greene on Jurancon II at Uttoxeter, 21 December.
 2003: Andrew Thornton on Kingscliff at Ascot, 22 November.
 2004: Timmy Murphy on Stormez in the Servo Computer Services Trophy, 13 November.
 2005: Matty Batchelor on King Harald in the Jewson Novices' Handicap Chase, 17 March.
 2006: Henry Oliver on Sissinghurst Storm at Chepstow, 18 April.
 2007: Andrew Thornton on Miko de Beauchene in the Welsh National, 27 December.
 2008: Robert Thornton on Nenuphar Collonges in the Albert Bartlett Novices' Hurdle, 14 March.
 2009: Tony McCoy on Wichita Lineman in the William Hill Trophy, 10 March.
 2010: Matt Crawley on Lastroseofsummer at Musselburgh, 19 November.
 2011: Maurice Linehan on Tarvini at Huntingdon
 2012: Tony McCoy on Synchronised in the Cheltenham Gold Cup, 16 March
 2013:
 2014:
 2015: Sean Bowen on Just A Par in the Bet365 Gold Cup, 25 April
 2016: Colm McCormack on Fiddler's Flight at Sedgefield, 9 February
 2017:
 2018: James Bowen on Raz De Maree in the Welsh Grand National, 6 January
 2019: Matty Bachelor on Noble Glance at Fontwell, 22 August
 2020: Jack Tudor on Potters Corner in the Welsh Grand National, 27 December 2019

Flat Jockey Special Recognition Award
 1996: Jimmy Quinn
 1997: Kevin Darley
 1998: George Duffield
 1999: George Duffield
 2000: Ray Cochrane
 2001: George Duffield
 2002: Pat Eddery
 2003: Pat Eddery
 2004: Willie Ryan
 2005: John Carroll
 2006: Richard Quinn
 2007: Kevin Darley
 2008: Dale Gibson
 2009: Dale Gibson
 2010: Paul Hanagan
 2011: Philip Robinson
 2012: Michael Hills
 2013:
 2014:
 2015: Jack Berry
 2016: Tom O'Ryan
 2017:
 2018: George Baker
 2019: Pat Smullen
 2020: Hollie Doyle

Jump Jockey Special Recognition Award
 1996: Andrew Thornton
 1997: Andrew Thornton
 1998: Simon McNeill
 1999: Gary Lyons
 2000: Peter Niven
 2001: Willie Worthington
 2002: Brian Storey
 2003: Norman Williamson
 2004: Vince Slattery
 2005: Jim Culloty
 2006: J. P. McNamara
 2007: Russ Garritty
 2008: Brian Harding
 2009: Jimmy McCarthy
 2010: Warren Marston
 2011: Anna O'Brien, physiotherapist
 2012: Campbell Gillies
 2013:
 2014:
 2015: Tony McCoy
 2016: Tom O'Ryan
 2017:
 2018: Andrew Thornton
 2019: Noel Fehily
 2020: Leighton Aspell

References

 thepja.co.uk – The Professional Jockeys Association.
 thepja.co.uk – The Lesters Past Winners.

Horse racing awards
Horse racing in Great Britain
British jockeys